Thick is an album by the fusion jazz band Tribal Tech released in 1999. As a contrast to Tribal Tech's previous recordings, the album features less compositional material and is based largely on improvisation.

Track listing
All tracks composed by Scott Henderson, Gary Willis, Scott Kinsey and Kirk Covington.
"Sheik of Encino" – 6:50
"Party at Kinsey's" – 3:56
"Jalapeño" – 5:42
"Clinic Troll" – 3:43
"Thick" – 11:15
"You May Remember Me" – 4:45
"Slick" – 5:14
"Somewhat Later" – 2:46
"What Has He Had?" – 6:52#
"A THIQUE man NAMED MILAN" - 5:55

Personnel
Scott Henderson - guitar
Gary Willis - bass
Scott Kinsey - keyboards
Kirk Covington - drums

References

1999 albums
Tribal Tech albums